CLP Group and its holding company, CLP Holdings Ltd, also known as China Light and Power Company, Limited (now CLP Power Hong Kong Ltd.), is an electricity company in Hong Kong. Incorporated in 1901 as China Light & Power Company Syndicate, its core business remains the generation, transmission, and retailing of electricity. It also has businesses in a number of Asian markets as well as EnergyAustralia in Australia. It is one of the two main electricity power generation companies in Hong Kong, the other being Hongkong Electric Company.

History

The company was founded in Hong Kong in 1901 as China Light & Power Company Syndicate by Shewan Tomes and Company and others. In 1903, the company's first power station, with a generating capacity of 75 kW, was commissioned in Hung Hom at the junction of present-day Chatham Road and Princess Margaret Road. By 1919, the company was supplying electricity for street lights in Kowloon.

The Kadoorie family joined the CLP board of directors in 1930 and retains control of the company as of 2013.

In 1983, the company established a joint venture with Guangdong Nuclear Power for the construction and operation of the Daya Bay Nuclear Power Plant.

On 6 January 1998, CLP Holdings Limited replaced China Light & Power Company, Limited as the new holding company listed on the Stock Exchange of Hong Kong.

In 2018, CLP established a new branch, CLP Innovation (previously named) and now CLP Digital. The branch has a separate company listing, Smart Energy Connect (SEC) that provides environmentally friendly solutions.

Index constituent
As of 2013, CLP Group is a component of The Global Dow—a 150-stock index of the world's leading blue-chips. The company has been a constituent of the Dow Jones Sustainability Index, the Dow Jones Sustainability Asia Pacific Index (DJSI Asia Pacific), and/or the Dow Jones Sustainability Asia Pacific 40 Index (DJSI Asia Pacific 40). Since 2010, CLP has also been listed on the Hang Seng Corporate Sustainability Index and Hang Seng (Mainland and HK) Corporate Sustainability Index.

Electricity Tariff
Residential Electricity Tariff (1 January to 31 December 2023)
https://www.clp.com.hk/content/dam/clphk/documents/tariff-adjustment-20221/TariffTable%20-%20English-(2023-01-01).pdf

Business Electricity Traiff (1 January to 31 December 2023)
https://www.clp.com.hk/zh/business/bills-payment-tariffs-business/bill-calculator

Markets outside Hong Kong
In recent years CLP has sought to expand outside of its native Hong Kong accomplishing this through mergers and acquisitions. Markets outside Hong Kong it has entered include Australia (through EnergyAustralia), India, Mainland China, Southeast Asia and Taiwan.

Its first market outside Hong Kong was mainland China, by way of connecting its power stations in Hong Kong to the Chinese mainland grid, CLP began supplying power in 1979.

The 1990s saw the start of expansionary M&A activity with CLP acquiring nearly a half-dozen companies between 1996 and 2005. In 1996 the company entered joint-ventures with Taiwan Cement Corporation; in 1998, part ownership of Thai Electricity Generating Public Co Ltd; and in 2001, Australian Yallourn Energy. It expanded operations in Australia to include retailing when it brought TXU Merchant Energy in 2005. And in 2002 CLP acquired an Indian company, Gujarat Paguthan Energy Corporation Private Limited.

Power stations
CLP has a number of power stations in Asia. While most are either coal-fired or fossil fuel power stations,  the company also generates electricity using nuclear, solar energy and wind power.

Hong Kong

Hong Kong sites include Black Point Power Station, Castle Peak Power Station, and Penny's Bay Power Station.

Mainland China
CLP was the equity investors of two power stations in Guangdong province, Daya Bay Nuclear Power Plant and Guangzhou Pumped Storage Power Station in Conghua, Guangzhou. It also operates a Guangxi province plant, Fangchenggang power station.

India
CLP power stations in India include gas powered Gujarat Paguthan Energy Corporation's former station Paguthan Combined Cycle Power Plant and a coal-fired power station Mahatma Gandhi Super Thermal Power Project at Jhajjar, Haryana, that was commissioned in 2012.

The company also has a number of wind power sites in the country. It has now signed up for its very first solar project - Veltoor at Telangana.

Australia
EnergyAustralia is a wholly owned subsidiary of CLP and is one of Australia's largest integrated energy businesses. As of 2013, EnergyAustralia generates electricity from coal, gas and renewable energy sources, and retails electricity and gas, of 5,662MW to over 2.8 million residential and business users across Victoria, South Australia, New South Wales, the ACT and Queensland.

Southeast Asia and Taiwan
CLP established its presence in Southeast Asia and Taiwan in the early 1990s. Since then, they have built a portfolio of quality assets in the region.

Following the divestment of interest in EGCO in Thailand in early 2011, their investments currently consist of the Ho-Ping coal-fired project in Taiwan and the Lopburi solar farm in Thailand. They are also co-developing two coal-fired projects in Vietnam.

References

External links
 

CLP Group official website
CLP Group's educational website – PowerU 

Electric power companies of Hong Kong
Multinational companies headquartered in Hong Kong
Companies in the Hang Seng Index
Companies listed on the Hong Kong Stock Exchange
Energy companies established in 1901
1901 establishments in Hong Kong